This is list of notable people who are known for their association with Hyderabad, Pakistan. It does not necessarily mean that they were born in the city or were even nationals of the country.

Intellectuals 
 Bherumal Meharchand Advani, writer, poet, researcher and scholar
 Kalyan Bulchand Advani, scholar, writer and educationist
 Nabi Bux Khan Baloch (1917–2011), linguist and author
 Hotchand Molchand Gurbakhshani, writer, scholar and educationist
 Muhammad Ibrahim Joyo (born 1915), scholar and translator
 K.M. Kundnani, Educationist
Muhammad Siddique Memon, Khan Bahadur (30 March 1890 - 20 November 1958), educationist, writer, social leader
 Ghulam Mustafa Khan (born 1912), researcher, and linguist
 Qabil Ajmeri (1931–1962), recognised as a "senior" poet of Urdu
 Mumtaz Mirza (born 1939) was expert of Sindhi literature, Culture of Sindh
 Mangharam Udharam Malkani (1896–1980) was a renowned Sindhi scholar, critic, writer, playwright, literary historian and professor
 Mirza Kalich Beg (1853–1929), civil servant and author

Government 
 Kunwar Naveed Jamil (5th mayor)
 Tayyab Hussain (6th mayor)
 Rizwan Ahmed (last deputy commissioner before LGO 2001)
 Sohail Mashadi (current deputy mayor)

Politicians 
 Dr Khalid Maqbool Siddiqui
 L K Advani
 Choudry Mohammad Sadiq (1900–1975), politician and Muslim Leaguer
 K. R. Malkani (1921–2003), Indian politician. Lieutenant-Governor of Pondicherry (2002–03)
 Jivatram Kripalani (1886–1982), Indian politician and Indian independence activist.
 Syed Qamar Zaman Shah (born 1933), the nephew and son-in-law of Late Syed Miran Mohammad Shah. Senator during the early 1970s.
 Syed Miran Mohammad Shah, speaker of Sindh legislative Assembly, Minister in the Sindh Government, Ambassador of Pakistan to Spain.

Sportsmen 
 Rizwan Ahmed (cricketer, born 1978)
 Abid Ali (cricketer, born 1979)
 Masroor Ali
 Mir Ali (cricketer)
 Faisal Athar
 Mohammad Awais
 Nasir Awais
 Farhan AyubAbdul Aziz (Hyderabad cricketer)
 Imran Brohi
 Azeem Ghumman
 Babar Khan (cricketer)
 Sharjeel Khan
 Shoaib Laghari
 Mohammad Waqas (cricketer, born 1987)

Arts and Culture 
Bulo C Rani (6 March 1920 – 24 March 1993) was a prominent Indian music director
Mustafa Qureshi (born 1938)  is a film and television actor
Rubina Qureshi (born 19 October 1940), folk singer
Zarina Baloch (29 December 1934 - 25 December 2005), folk singer

Spiritual Leaders 
 Sadhu T. L. Vaswani (1879–1966), Hindu spiritualist. Founder of the Sadhu Vaswani Mission.

Businessmen 
 Bhai Pratap Dialdas was an Indian businessman, philanthropist and freedom fighter
 Hotchand Gopaldas Advani, Businessman and Educationist

Military 
 Hoshu Sheedi, General of Talpur Mirs' Army, which fought against British in the Battles of Miani and last Battle of Dubbo.

Sources
Diwan Bherumal Meharchand. "Amilan Jo Ahwal"- 24 March 1919
 Amilan Jo Ahwal (1919) - Translated into English ("A History of the Amils") at www.saibaba-fund.org/sindhis.html

Hyderabad, Sindh
Hyderabad (Pakistan) cricketers
Hyderabad, Sindh-related lists
Hyderabad District, Pakistan
Hyderabad, Sindh